Judith Copithorne (born 1939) is a Canadian concrete and visual poet. Born to an artistic family, she established many contributions to concrete poetry with her style of writing, in both poetry and visual poetry.

Life and career
Judith Copithorne grew up in Vancouver, British Columbia, in an artistic family. Her childhood was filled with the artistic milieu of her parents and the books left by an artist uncle who died young, all of which gave her wide-ranging ideas about the possibilities of art and literature. Judith Copithorne started writing and drawing at an early age and, by the time she attended the University of British Columbia, had formed her own ideas about the arts. At UBC, she studied under such prominent figures as Warren Tallman and George Woodcock.

In the early 1960s she became acquainted with an informal group of "Downtown Poets," including writers such as Gladys (Maria) Hindmarch, John Newlove, bill bissett, Gerry Gilbert, Maxine Gadd and Roy Kiyooka, centered around the Vancouver venues of Sound Gallery, Motion Studio and Intermedia Press. The Downtown Poets were involved in more radical experimentation than the established TISH group of the University of British Columbia, represented by poets such as George Bowering, Fred Wah, Frank Davey and Daphne Marlatt. The appellation "Downtown poets" was invented by UBC professor Warren Tallman to distinguish the San Francisco Renaissance-influenced UBC writers from the homegrown Canadian poets.

Judith Copithorne has made many contributions to concrete poetry and other types of experimental writing in prose, poetry and visual poetry, with works centering on domestic space and community. Her primary work involves the intersection of text and visual forms, with early work combining text with abstract line drawings, called Poem-drawings. Copithorne continued to explore various media and by 2015 was working almost entirely with computer generated compositions. In the Introduction to the anthology Four Parts Sand, she describes her work in the following manner: 
 Published in the first issues of blewointment and Ganglia, Copithorne went on to publish over 40 books, chapbooks and ephemeral items (a bibliography of her work was published by jwcurry in the March, 2009 issue #400 of 1 cent).

Selected works
Returning (Returning Press, 1965)
Meandering (Returning Press, 1967)
Release: Poem-Drawings (Bau-Xi Gallery, 1969)
Rain (Ganglia Press, 1969)
Runes (Coach House Books/Intermedia, 1971)
Miss Tree's Pillow Book (Intermedia/Returning Press, 1971)
Until Now (Heshe&ItWorks, 1971)
Heart's Tide (Vancouver Community Press Writing Series #8, 1972)
History's Wife: a sculpture (Community Cultural Feedback Project, 1972)
Arrangements (Intermedia Press, 1973)
Albion's Rose Blooms to Calypso Beat (Ganglia Press, 1985)
A Light Character (Coach House Books, 1985)
Third Day of Fast (Silver Birch Press, 1987)
Horizon (Pangen Subway Ritual, 1992)
Carbon Dioxide (Silver Birch Press, 1992)
For my ancestors (Curvd H&z, 1994)
Tern: (Returning Press, 2000)
Brackets & Boundaries (Returning Press, 2012)
see lex ions (Xerolage 62; Xexoxial Editions, 2015)
Phases / Phrases (Trainwreck Press, 2019)

Anthologies
west coast seen, Jim Brown, ed. (Talonbooks, 1969)
the cosmic chef, bpNichol, ed. (Oberon Press, 1970)
I Am A Sensation, Gerry Goldberg & George Wright, eds. (McClelland & Stewart, 1971)
New Directions in Canadian Poetry, John Robert Colombo, ed. (Holt, Rinehart and Winston of Canada, 1971)
Four Parts Sand, Michael Macklem, ed. (Oberon Press, 1972)
w)here? the other canadian poetry, Eldon Garnet, ed. (Press Porcepic, 1974)
THE LAST BLEWOINTMENT ANTHOLOGY VOLUME 1, bill bissett, ed. (Nightwood Editions, 1985)
Vancouver Poetry, Allan Safarik, ed. (Polestar Press, 1986)
Judith, Women Making Visual Poetry, Amanda Earl, ed. (Timglaset Editions, 2021)

See also

Canadian literature
Canadian poetry
List of Canadian poets

References

External links
"Abstract / Concrete #1: Judith Copithorne (By derek beaulieu)"
"Ian Whistle on Judith Copithorne"
"Squaring the vowels - On the visual poetry of Judith Copithorne" - Interview by Gary Barwin, October 23, 2013
"UbuWeb Visual Poetry: Judith Copithorne"
Ruins in Process, "Vancouver Art in the Sixties"
Ruins in Process, "Judith Copithorne's Sketchbook"
ditch, poetry magazine, "Judith Copithorne"
"Giantesses: Gadd, Copithorne, Rodin & Robertson" & "Concrete Vancouver"
"And blood poured down"
"Copithorne, Judith" Explorations in Media Ecology, Volume 18, Number 3, 1 September 2019, pp. 307-316(10)
Judith Copithorne An Introduction

1939 births
20th-century Canadian poets
20th-century Canadian women writers
21st-century Canadian poets
21st-century Canadian women writers
Canadian women poets
Writers from Vancouver
Living people
Visual poets